Dassault Systèmes GEOVIA is a set of geologic modeling and mining engineering software applications developed by the French engineering software company Dassault Systèmes. Formerly known as Gemcom, the company was founded in 1985 as a spin-off from by mining consultants SRK Consulting, with headquarters in Vancouver, British Columbia, Canada.

References

Geology software
Mining engineering